The 2022 Big East men's basketball tournament was the postseason men's basketball tournament for the Big East Conference, held March 9–12, 2022, at Madison Square Garden in New York City. The winner of the tournament, the Villanova Wildcats, received the conference's automatic bid to the 2022 NCAA tournament.

Seeds 
All 11 Big East schools are scheduled to participated in the tournament. Teams will be seeded by the conference record with tie-breaking procedures to determine the seeds for teams with identical conference records. The top five teams will receive first-round byes. Seeding for the tournament will be determined at the close of the regular conference season.

Schedule

Bracket

* denotes overtime period

References 

Tournament
Big East men's basketball tournament
Basketball competitions in New York City
College sports tournaments in New York City
Sports in Manhattan
Big East men's basketball tournament
Big East men's basketball tournament
2020s in Manhattan